Estrela de Cantanhez Futebol Clube is a football (soccer) club from Guinea-Bissau.

Achievements
Taça Nacional da Guiné Bissau: 1
2013.

Performance in CAF competitions
CAF Confederation Cup: 1 appearance
2014 –

References

External links
Team profile – leballonrond.fr

Football clubs in Guinea-Bissau